Frank Burns  (born October 21, 1975) is a Democratic member of the Pennsylvania House of Representatives. He represents the 72nd District, made up of parts of Cambria and Somerset counties.

Biography
Before being elected as a state representative, Burns served as a township supervisor for East Taylor Township and as a Cambria County representative to the Pennsylvania Democratic State Committee. 

Burns currently sits on the Consumer Affairs, Professional Licensure, Tourism & Recreational Development, and Veterans Affairs & Emergency Preparedness committees.

References

External links

Pennsylvania House of Representatives - Frank Burns  (Democrat) official PA House website
Pennsylvania House Democratic Caucus - Frank Burns official Party website

Living people
Democratic Party members of the Pennsylvania House of Representatives
Politicians from Johnstown, Pennsylvania
1975 births
21st-century American politicians